KamaGames is a game developer and publisher of mobile and social-network games, including Pokerist Texas Poker.

Products and platforms 
KamaGames develops casino and recreational game titles, most of which are free-to-play.
 Pokerist: Texas Poker – A casino-style version of the Texas hold 'em poker variant for mobile platforms. It was listed as one of the Best Apps of 2012 by Apple and was awarded Top App by Opera in 2012 in the Card Games category. Since 2011, it has been consistently featured among the US App Stores’ 100 Top Grossing Apps. Pokerist is available for iOS, Android, Bada, Facebook, VK, Odnoklassniki, and Mac.
 Roulettist
 Blackjackist
 Egg Punch2
 Manchester United Social Poker
 Manchester United Social Roulette
 AEW Casino: Double or Nothing

Publishing unit 
KamaGames introduced a publishing programme in June 2013 to create partnerships with developers of mobile games. This programme offers development studios a minimum investment to fund their game's soft launch and support services.

History 
KamaGames international headquarters are based in Dublin, Ireland. KamaGames was founded in 2010. KamaGames is currently working with teams of developers from Russia, the US and India.

SCi Power 25 Rating 
On August 8, 2013 KamaGames was featured at number 14 in the SCi Power 25 Rating by Social Casino Intelligence. The SCi Power 25 Rating is compiled annually to distinguish industry leaders worldwide.

References

External links 
 

Video game development companies
Video game companies of Ireland
Companies based in Dublin (city)
Video game publishers